Weightlifting was part of the 1987 National Games of China held in Guangdong. Only men competed in ten bodyweight categories, although the first women's World Championships (which featured a Chinese team) was also held in 1987.

The competition program at the National Games mirrors that of the Olympic Games as only medals for the total achieved are awarded, but not for individual lifts in either the snatch or clean and jerk. Likewise an athlete failing to register a snatch result cannot advance to the clean and jerk.

Medal summary

Men

Medal table

References
Archived results of the 1987 Games 

1987 in weightlifting
1987 in Chinese sport
1987